The discography of Swedish singer and songwriter Petra Marklund, also known as September, consists of seven studio albums, four compilation albums, one extended play and 41 singles. September released her debut album, September, in 2004; it spawned three top 10 hits: "La La La (Never Give It Up)", "We Can Do It" and "September All Over". Her second studio album, In Orbit, was released in 2005 and produced two top 10 hits in Sweden: "Satellites"  and  "Cry for You", while the second single from the album, "Looking for Love", peaked inside the top 20. "Cry for You" was a worldwide hit and remains September's biggest hit to date, peaking inside the top 10 in countries such as Austria, Denmark, the Netherlands, France, Ireland, Switzerland and the United Kingdom. The song also peaked at number 74 on the Hot 100 in the United States and was certified gold for shipment of over 500,000 copies by the Recording Industry Association of America. The song was the first by a Swedish artist to be certified by the RIAA since Ace of Base's "Cruel Summer" in 1998.

September released her third album, Dancing Shoes, in 2007. Three singles were released from it: "Can't Get Over", "Until I Die" and "Because I Love You". The first two singles peaked inside the top 5 in Sweden. "Can't Get Over" received moderate success worldwide, charting inside the top 50 in most countries; in the United Kingdom, it peaked at number 12. In 2008, September released her debut album in the United States, Canada and Australia called September; it includes songs from her previous albums, In Orbit and Dancing Shoes. In the United Kingdom, Cry For You was released as her debut album. September's fourth studio album, Love CPR, was released in 2011 and reached number one in the Swedish album chart, becoming her first number-one hit there. The album spawned six singles, including the number-one hit "Mikrofonkåt", "Resuscitate Me", "Me & My Microphone", "Party in My Head" as well as "Hands Up", which was later featured in the American comedy film Last Vegas. In 2012, Marklund released her fifth studio album, Inferno, under her real name. It reached number one in Sweden and its lead single, "Händerna mot himlen", peaked at number two and was certified 6× Platinum.

Studio albums

September

Petra Marklund

Compilation albums

September

Notes
A  The album did not chart on the official ARIA Albums Chart, but did chart on the ARIA Hitseekers chart.
B  The album did not chart on the official Billboard 200, but did chart on the Billboard Top Electronic chart.

Extended plays

Petra Marklund

Singles

September

As lead artist

As featured artist

Petra Marklund

As lead artist

As featured artist

Notes

References

Marklund, Petra